Bartłomiej Lemański (born 19 March 1996) is a Polish volleyball player. At the professional club level, he plays for Cerrad Enea Czarni Radom.

Career

Clubs
In 2014–2016 he was sent on loan to AZS Politechnika Warszawska. He was in top 10 best blockers of the 2014–15 PlusLiga season. In 2016, he joined Asseco Resovia.

National team
In 2013 alongside  his national team he achieved a bronze medal of the 2013 U19 World Championship. Ferdinando De Giorgi called Lemański up to the Polish national team for the 2017 FIVB Volleyball World League.

Honours

Youth national team
 2013  CEV U19 European Championship
 2013  European Youth Olympic Festival

Universiade
 2019  Summer Universiade

References

External links

 
 Player profile at PlusLiga.pl 
 Player profile at Volleybox.net

1996 births
Living people
Volleyball players from Warsaw
Polish men's volleyball players
Universiade medalists in volleyball
Universiade silver medalists for Poland
Medalists at the 2019 Summer Universiade
Projekt Warsaw players
Resovia (volleyball) players
Stal Nysa players
Czarni Radom players
Middle blockers